Payback is a Hindi thriller film, directed by Sachin P. Karande and produced by Sarosh Khan. The film released on 17 December 2010 under the Archangel Entertainment banner.

Plot 
Insurance employee Kunal (Munish Khan) suffers an almost fatal accident but is rescued by passer-by Raghu (Zakir Hussain). Three months later Kunal and Raghu meet again, and Kunal invites Raghu for a tea. That night he realizes that Raghu, while his saviour, is an assassin who is hunted by his enemies. When Kunal's girlfriend (Sara Khan) becomes involved, Kunal must decide between saving his love and repaying his debt to Raghu.

Cast

 Munish Khan as Kunal Sahay
 Sara Khan as Ishita Sahani
 Gulshan Grover as Inspector Sawant
 Zakir Hussain as Raghu Satoskar
 Mukesh Tiwari as Pakya
 Hrishikesh Joshi as Bhau Bhosle
 Kunal Kumar as Rohit Sharma

Reception 
Taran Adarsh, writing for Bollywood Hungama, was critical of the movie. While he lauded the chase scenes and found the film's one song "foot-tapping", he felt the constant moving of the camera got irritating and concluded the screenplay, which he described as "hackneyed", "uninteresting" and "inconsistent", ruined what might have otherwise been an interesting film.

References

External links
 
 

2010 films
2010s Hindi-language films